Kuhestan Rural District is a rural district (dehestan) in the Central District of Behshahr County, Mazandaran Province, Iran. At the 2006 census, its population was 17,420, consisting 4,453 families. The rural district has 10 villages.

References 

Rural Districts of Mazandaran Province
Behshahr County